SC1 or SC-1 may refer to:
South Carolina's 1st congressional district
, a United States Navy submarine chaser commissioned in 1917 and sold in 1921
 SC-01 speech synthesizer by Votrax
 SC01, a FIPS 10-4 region code, see List of FIPS region codes (S–U)
 SC-01, a subdivision code for the Seychelles, see ISO 3166-2:SC

Video games
 The first title in the StarCraft series.
 The first title in the SimCity series
 The first title in the Tom Clancy's Splinter Cell series

Aircraft
Signal Corps Dirigible No. 1 A 1908 Dirigible built by Thomas Scott Baldwin
Curtiss SC-1 Seahawk, a version of the American Curtiss SC Seahawk seaplane
Martin SC-1, a version of the American Curtiss CS reconnaissance and torpedo bomber aircraft
Short SC.1, the first British fixed-wing vertical take-off and landing (VTOL) aircraft
Southern Cross Aviation SC-1, an Australian civil aircraft